104.1 Yes The Best (DZVM 104.1 MHz) is an FM station owned by Manila Broadcasting Company and operated by Star East Production & Marketing Services. Its studios and transmitter are located at the 2nd Floor, Public Market, Brgy. Poblacion, Urdaneta, Pangasinan.

References

External links
Yes The Best Urdaneta FB Page
Yes The Best Urdaneta Website

Radio stations in Dagupan
Radio stations established in 2010